The 54th Infantry Division (54-ya Pekhotnaya Diviziya) was an infantry formation of the Russian Imperial Army.

Organization
1st Brigade
213th Infantry Regiment
214th Infantry Regiment
2nd Brigade
215th Infantry Regiment
216th Infantry Regiment
54th Artillery Brigade

References

Infantry divisions of the Russian Empire